Caladenia excelsa,  commonly known as the giant spider orchid, is a species of orchid endemic to a small area in the south-west of Western Australia. It is a rare species with a single, hairy leaf and up to three cream-coloured to greenish-cream flowers with long, drooping sepals and petals. It is one of the tallest spider orchids in Western Australia and, with Caladenia splendens, has the largest flowers of any Western Australian orchid.

Description 
The sepals and petals have long, brownish, drooping thread-like tips. There are four rows of maroon or white calli along the centre line of the labellum. Flowering occurs from late September to early November.

Taxonomy and naming 
Caladenia excelsa was first described by Stephen Hopper and Andrew Brown in 2001 from a specimen collected by Hopper near Margaret River. The description was published in Nuytsia. The specific epithet (excelsa) is a Latin word meaning "high" or "lofty" referring to the tallness of the flower spike.

Distribution and habitat 
The giant spider orchid is found between Dunsborough and Karridale in the Jarrah Forest and Warren biogeographic regions where it grows in forests in deep sandy soils.

Conservation
Caladenia excelsa is classified as "Threatened Flora (Declared Rare Flora — Extant)" by the Western Australian Government Department of Parks and Wildlife  and it has also been listed as "Endangered" (EN) under the Australian Government Environment Protection and Biodiversity Conservation Act 1999 (EPBC Act). The main threats to the species are weed invasion, grazing (especially by the Western grey kangaroo), prescribed burning and infrastructure maintenance.

References 

excelsa
Orchids of Western Australia
Endemic orchids of Australia
Plants described in 2001
Endemic flora of Southwest Australia
Taxa named by Stephen Hopper
Taxa named by Andrew Phillip Brown